Homaluroides is a genus of grass flies in the family Chloropidae. There are about 9 described species in Homaluroides.

Species
 Homaluroides abdominalis (Coquillett, 1895)
 Homaluroides distichliae (Malloch, 1918)
 Homaluroides gramineus (Coquillett, 1898)
 Homaluroides ingratus (Williston, 1893)
 Homaluroides melleus (Loew, 1872)
 Homaluroides mexicanus (Duda, 1930)
 Homaluroides pilosulus (Becker, 1912)
 Homaluroides quinquepunctatus (Loew, 1863)
 Homaluroides surdus (Curran, 1930)

References

Further reading

External links

 Diptera.info

Chloropinae